Chilliwack Lake is a lake in the upper basin of the Chilliwack River southeast of the city of the same name in the Lower Mainland of British Columbia, Canada. The lake, while entirely within Canada, is located just north of the border between British Columbia and the state of Washington and is both fed and drained by the Chilliwack River, which has its source in the North Cascades of Washington state and Canada, which surround the lake on all sides.

Parks and recreation 

Chilliwack Lake Provincial Park is located on the lake's shores on the Canadian end of the lake.  At the south end of the lake, there is a large beach, often a partying location, where the at-this-point-slough-like Chilliwack River enters the far end of the lake.  There is also a trail that leads into an old growth forest along the river above the lake.  It starts near the lake's far end.  If you head off trail and ford the river, you can find the difficult trail to Hanging Lake.

Boating 
Chilliwack Lake can be ideal for canoeing, kayaking, paddle-boarding and small motorized boats.  It is important to understand local conditions prior to departure as strong afternoon winds can strand unsuspecting people on the east end of this alpine lake.  Also note that dangerous currents exist on the south-west corner of the lake where the water flows into the Chilliwack River.

There is a boat launch that is suitable for boats under 20 feet in length at the west end of the lake.  Water levels fluctuate throughout the year and the boat launch can become unusable due to either high water completely submerging it, or low water exposing jagged rocks - use at your own risk.

Climate
Chilliwack Lake has an oceanic climate (Köppen climate type Cfb).

Road closures 
The road on the east side of the lake leading to its far end has been closed off to all but regular vehicles.  ATVs and dirtbikes are not permitted on the road beyond the south boundary of Chilliwack Lake Provincial Park.  In addition to that, the road has been decommissioned.

References

Lakes of the Lower Mainland
Canadian Cascades
North Cascades of Washington (state)
Lakes of Whatcom County, Washington
Lakes of Washington (state)